László Kleinheisler (born 8 April 1994) is a Hungarian professional footballer who plays as a midfielder for Greek Super League club Panathinaikos.

Club career

Videoton
Having joined Hungarian club Videoton FC in 2013, he made his debut in the Hungarian first division on 28 July 2013 against Haladás, while also scoring his first league goal in an eventual 2–0 home win.

On 28 July 2013, he scored his first goal in the 2013–2014 season against Szombathelyi Haladás at the Sóstói Stadion, Székesfehérvár. The match ended with a 2–0 victory for Videoton FC. In the rest of the season he scored another three goals, one against Újpest FC at the Sóstói Stadion on 6 October 2013, one against Mezőkövesd-Zsóry SE in a 1–0 victory at the Sóstói Stadion on 8 November 2013, and the last goal against Diósgyőri VTK at the DVTK Stadion in a 2–2 draw match on 24 November 2013.

In the 2014–2015 season, he played only 370 minutes in 11 appearances for Videoton FC and 911 minutes in 12 appearances for Puskás Akadémia FC. In July 2015, Kleinheisler refused to sign the extension of his contract with Videoton, therefore he was ousted to the reserves for the 2015–2016 season. Videoton refused to sell him to the Ekstraklasa club Śląsk Wrocław in August.

Werder Bremen
On 20 January 2016, Kleinheisler joined Werder Bremen on a 3.5-year contract for an undisclosed fee. He made his debut in the Bundesliga on 30 January 2016 against Hertha BSC in the Weserstadion. He was brought onto the pitch in the 62nd minute at 2–0 to Berlin and helped Bremen come back from 2–0 and 3–1 deficits to earn a 3–3 draw.

SV Darmstadt 98 (loan)
On 13 August 2016, Kleinheisler joined German club SV Darmstadt 98 for a season-long loan deal. On 22 October 2016, he scored his first goal in the Bundesliga on the 8th match day of the 2016–17 Bundesliga in a 3–1 victory over Wolfsburg. He was selected for the team of week 8 of the 2016–17 Bundesliga season after this goal.

Ferencváros (loan)
On 20 January 2017, Kleinheisler's loan at Darmstadt was cut short and he joined Ferencváros on loan for the second half of the season.

Astana (loan)
On 20 June 2017, Kleinheisler joined FC Astana on a year-long loan deal.

NK Osijek
On 16 January 2019, NK Osijek announced that Kleinheisler had cancelled his contract with Astana, and had signed a 3.5-year contract with NK Osijek.

Panathinaikos
In January 2023 he signed for Panathinaikos. On 5 February 2023, he scored his first goal for the club in a 2-0 win over Lamia.

International career
On 6 November 2015, Bernd Storck announced the Hungarian national team squad for the UEFA Euro 2016 qualifying play-off match against Norway. The biggest surprise was the inclusion of Kleinheisler because he had not played a single match in the 2015–16 Nemzeti Bajnokság I season. Six days later, he scored on his debut against Norway at the Ullevaal Stadion in Oslo, Norway in the first leg of the UEFA Euro 2016 qualifying play-offs.

He was selected for Hungary's Euro 2016 squad. He played the full 90 minutes in each of Hungary's first two matches in the group phase. In the first match, a 2–0 win against Austria, he assisted Ádám Szalai for the first goal and was voted "Man of the Match". Having received a yellow card in the second match against Iceland and with Hungary already qualified for the round of sixteen, Kleinheisler was rested in the third match.

On 1 June 2021, Kleinheisler was included in the final 26-man squad to represent Hungary at the rescheduled UEFA Euro 2020 tournament.

Personal life
His nickname is "Scholes", after Paul Scholes, because they are both red-haired and short-sized.

Career statistics

Club

International
.

Scores and results list Hungary's goal tally first, score column indicates score after each Kleinheisler goal.

Honours

Videoton
 Nemzeti Bajnokság I: 2014-15

Ferencvárosi TC
 Hungarian Cup: 2016–17

References

External links

 Vidi.hu Profile
 Profile at magyarfutball.hu
 
 
 
 

1994 births
Living people
People from Kazincbarcika
Hungarian footballers
Hungary youth international footballers
Hungary under-21 international footballers
Hungary international footballers
Hungarian people of German descent
Association football midfielders
Puskás Akadémia FC players
Fehérvár FC players
SV Werder Bremen players
SV Darmstadt 98 players
Ferencvárosi TC footballers
FC Astana players
Nemzeti Bajnokság I players
NK Osijek players
Croatian Football League players
Bundesliga players
Kazakhstan Premier League players
UEFA Euro 2016 players
UEFA Euro 2020 players
Hungarian expatriate footballers
Hungarian expatriate sportspeople in Germany
Expatriate footballers in Germany
Expatriate footballers in Kazakhstan
Sportspeople from Borsod-Abaúj-Zemplén County